Ariel Pedro Martinez González (born 9 May 1986) is a Cuban footballer who currently plays for USL Championship club Tampa Bay Rowdies.

Club career
Following his defection Martínez signed with United Soccer League club Charleston Battery, but was not cleared to play until late in the season due to issues with the processing of his documentation and work permit. Martínez made his only appearance for Charleston in a playoff loss to Louisville City before leaving the club at the end of 2015.

In March 2016, Martínez signed for North American Soccer League side Miami FC ahead of its inaugural season.

Martínez made the move to USL Championship side FC Tulsa on 18 December 2019.

On 19 January 2021, Miami, now competing in the USL Championship, announced Martínez had re-signed with the team for the 2021 season.

On 19 April, 2022, Hartford Athletic announced that they had signed Martínez for the remainder of the 2022 season, pending league and federation approval. 

Martínez signed with the Tampa Bay Rowdies on 19 January 2023.

International career
Martínez made his debut for Cuba in a September 2006 Gold Cup qualification match against the Turks and Caicos Islands. He was a squad member at the 2007 Gold Cup Finals. He has earned a total of 54 caps, scoring 11 goals, represented his country in 7 FIFA World Cup qualification matches and played at 3 CONCACAF Gold Cup final tournaments.

On 17 July 2015, it was confirmed that Martinez had, alongside teammates Keyler García, Arael Argüelles and Darío Suárez, defected to the United States following Cuba's victory over Guatemala in the CONCACAF Gold Cup.

Statistics

Career

International goals
Scores and results list Cuba's goal tally first.
'''

References

1986 births
Living people
People from Sancti Spíritus
Defecting Cuban footballers
Association football forwards
Cuban footballers
Cuba international footballers
2007 CONCACAF Gold Cup players
2013 CONCACAF Gold Cup players
2014 Caribbean Cup players
2015 CONCACAF Gold Cup players
FC Sancti Spíritus players
FC Camagüey players
Charleston Battery players
FC Tulsa players
Miami FC players
Hartford Athletic players
Tampa Bay Rowdies players
North American Soccer League players
National Independent Soccer Association players
Cuban expatriate footballers
Expatriate soccer players in the United States
Cuban expatriate sportspeople in the United States
USL Championship players